Melanie Kohn (born March 20, 1964) is a former child actress noted for voicing Lucy van Pelt during the 1970s.

Career 
Kohn, a native of San Francisco, voiced the character in It's a Mystery, Charlie Brown, It's the Easter Beagle, Charlie Brown, Be My Valentine, Charlie Brown and You're a Good Sport, Charlie Brown (for which she also provided the voice of Loretta).

She returned to voice the same character in the feature-length film Race for Your Life, Charlie Brown. Melanie Kohn is the sister of Robin Kohn, who has also voiced Lucy van Pelt.

Filmography

References

External links

American child actresses
American voice actresses
Living people
Place of birth missing (living people)
1964 births